Lieutenant-General Sir Henry James Warre  (12 January 1819 – 3 April 1898) was a British Army officer.

Early life

Warre was born in Cape Town, Cape Colony, the son of Lieutenant-General Sir William Warre (1784–1853) and Selina Anna Maling, the youngest daughter of Christopher Thompson Maling. His father saw service in the Peninsular War as aide-de-camp to William Beresford, 1st Viscount Beresford. His mother's elder sister Sophia married Henry Phipps, 1st Earl of Mulgrave, and was the mother of Constantine Phipps, 1st Marquess of Normanby.

He was baptised on his first birthday at St Nicholas Church, Brighton, Sussex.

Military career
Educated at the Royal Military College, Sandhurst, Warre was commissioned into the 54th Regiment of Foot in 1837. He became aide-de-camp to Sir Richard Downes Jackson, Commander-in-Chief of the Forces in British North America in 1839.

In 1845 he was sent on a military reconnaissance mission with Mervin Vavasour to the Oregon Country to prepare for a potential Anglo-American war over the territory. During the trip he made paintings and sketches of the region, and reported on possible military preparations.

Warre commanded the 57th Regiment of Foot in the Crimean War in 1855. Later he led his regiment in the Second Taranaki War in New Zealand in Spring 1865, seizing Māori land on the north Taranaki coast and establishing posts from Pukearuhe, 50 km north of New Plymouth, to Ōpunake, 80 km south of the town. He became Commander-in-Chief of the Bombay Army in 1878 and served in that role during the Second Anglo-Afghan War until he retired in 1881.

Warre was also a talented artist and published two books of sketches from his journeys: Sketches in North America and the Oregon Territory (1848) and Sketches in the Crimea (1856).

References

External links

 

1819 births
1898 deaths
Graduates of the Royal Military College, Sandhurst
British Army generals
British military personnel of the New Zealand Wars
Knights Commander of the Order of the Bath
Members of the Bombay Legislative Council
Military leaders of the New Zealand Wars